In mathematical morphology, the h-maxima transform is a morphological operation used to filter local maxima of an image based on local contrast information. First, all local maxima are defined as connected pixels in a given neighborhood with intensity level greater than pixels outside the neighborhood. Second, all local maxima that have height  lower or equal to a given threshold are suppressed.

References 
 Soille, P., "Morphological Image Analysis: Principles and Applications" (Chapter 6), 2nd edition (2003), .

Mathematical morphology